HandyDART is an accessible transit service in British Columbia that uses vans or small buses to transport disabled or elderly passengers who cannot use the normal transit system. This service  provides door-to-door service and is available in all of the province's larger centres, as well as in many smaller communities.

BC Transit
BC Transit operates 16 Custom Transit (handyDART) Systems
 Alberni-Clayoquot
 Campbell River
 Central Fraser Valley
 Chilliwack
 Cranbrook
 Kamloops
 Kelowna Regional
 Kitimat
 Kootenay Boundary
 Nanaimo Regional
 Penticton
 Prince George
 Prince Rupert
 Vernon Regional
 Victoria Regional
 West Kootenay

Metro Vancouver
In Metro Vancouver the current contractor for HandyDART service is First Canada.

Roster
 Ford Cut-Away Vans - modified mini buses (Ford Transit chassis)
 Chevrolet and GMC Cut-Away Vans - modified mini buses (Chevrolet Express/GMC Savana chassis)

Accessibility is also linked with other modes of transit on TransLink:
 All buses and Community Shuttles
 SkyTrain
 West Coast Express passenger cars
 SeaBus

See also
 Coast Mountain Bus Company
 Cutaway bus
Sorter  van* TransLink (British Columbia)

References

External links

 HandyDART Modernization Program (2022)

Paratransit services in Canada
TransLink (British Columbia)
Transport in Greater Vancouver